Rick Eldridge (born July 12, 1957) is an American politician. He is a Republican representing Tennessee's 10th House District, which solely encompasses the Western portion of Hamblen County and Grainger County, in the Tennessee House of Representatives.

Political career 
Eldridge served as a Hamblen County commissioner for eight years, including two terms as chairman.

In 2018, Eldridge ran for election to the District 10 seat in the Tennessee House of Representatives, which was being vacated by Tilman Goins. He defeated Tommy Pedigo in the Republican primary, and Democrat Barbara Simmons in the general election.

In 2020, Eldridge ran unopposed in both the Republican primary and general election, being re-elected on November 3, 2020 with 17,133 votes.

In August 2021, Eldridge joined all the state house Republicans in signing a letter to call for a special session to take action against schools requiring masks. Governor Bill Lee issued an executive order allowing parents to opt students out of school mask mandates instead of calling the special session. In October 2021, Eldridge voted in favor of a bill allowing partisan elections for school boards, which have traditionally been nonpartisan in Tennessee. In December 2021, Eldridge voiced his opposition to the state's new redistricting plan that would split Hamblen County in half with District 10 in the west and District 11 in the east. He stated he would vote no on the plan.

Current committees
As of December 2021, Eldridge sits on the following committees:
 State Committee (Vice-Chair)
 Children and Family Affairs Subcommittee
 Civil Justice Committee
 Corrections Subcommittee
 Naming, Designating, & Private Acts Committee
 Covid-19 Committee of the Third Extraordinary Session

Electoral record

References 

Republican Party members of the Tennessee House of Representatives
Living people
1957 births
21st-century American politicians